Mueang Phetchabun is the capital district (amphoe mueang) of Phetchabun province, northern Thailand.

History

Mueang Phetchabun was an ancient frontier city, established in Sukhothai era. Prince Damrong Rajanubhab founded the forts on both banks of the Pa Sak River. Inside the old city is a Wat Mahathat, the symbol of an important city.

During the Thesaphiban administrative reform, Phetchabun Province was merged with Lom Sak, and became part of the Monthon Phetchabun in 1899. Monthon Phetchabun was included as part of Monthon Phitsanulok in 1904 and re-established in 1907. The monthon was again included in Phitsanulok in 1915.

Due to its strategic location, in 1943  Mueang Phetchabun was proposed as the new capital of Thailand, to be named Nakhonban Phetchabun (นครบาลเพชรบูรณ์). This proposal, by Prime Minister Field Marshal Plaek Phibunsongkhram, was not approved by parliament, thus it continued to be a district as before.

Geography
Neighboring districts are (from the south clockwise) Nong Phai, Chon Daen, Wang Pong of Phetchabun Province, Noen Maprang of Phitsanulok province, Khao Kho, Lom Sak of Phetchabun Province, Khon San and Nong Bua Daeng of Chaiyaphum province.

Tat Mok National Park (อุทยานแห่งชาติตาดหมอก) is in the district.

The main water resource is the Pa Sak River.

Administration

Central administration 
Mueang Phetchabun is divided into 17 subdistricts (tambons), which are further subdivided into 221 administrative villages (mubans).

Local administration 
There is one town (thesaban mueang) in the district:
 Phetchabun consisting of sub-district Nai Mueang.

There are three sub-district municipalities (thesaban tambons) in the district:
 Tha Phon consisting of parts of sub-district Tha Phon.
 Wang Chomphu consisting of parts of sub-district Wang Chomphu.
 Na Ngua consisting of sub-district Na Ngua.

There are 15 sub-district administrative organizations (SAO) in the district:
 Tabo consisting of sub-district Tabo.
 Ban Tok consisting of sub-district Ban Tok.
 Sadiang consisting of sub-district Sadiang.
 Pa Lao consisting of sub-district Pa Lao.
 Tha Phon consisting of parts of sub-district Tha Phon.
 Dong Mun Lek consisting of sub-district Dong Mun Lek.
 Ban Khok consisting of sub-district Ban Khok.
 Chon Phrai consisting of sub-district Chon Phrai.
 Na Pa consisting of sub-district Na Pa.
 Na Yom consisting of sub-district Na Yom.
 Wang Chomphu consisting of parts of sub-district Wang Chomphu.
 Nam Ron consisting of sub-district Nam Ron.
 Huai Sakae consisting of sub-district Huai Sakae.
 Huai Yai consisting of sub-district Huai Yai.
 Rawing consisting of sub-district Rawing.

References

External links
amphoe.com (Thai)

Mueang Phetchabun